Yammer is an enterprise social networking service that is part of the Microsoft 365 family of products. It is used mainly for private communication within organizations but is also used for networks spanning various organizations. Access to a Yammer network is determined by a user's Internet domain so that only individuals with approved email addresses may join their respective networks.

The service began as an internal communication system for the genealogy website Geni.com, and was launched as an independent product in 2008. Microsoft later acquired Yammer in 2012, for US$1.2 billion. Currently Yammer is included in all enterprise plans of Microsoft 365.

History

Pre-acquisition

In 2008, Yammer was built as an internal feature for Geni by David O. Sacks. After 6 months of use at Geni, Sacks brought Yammer to TechCrunch50 to showcase its abilities and launch the product as an independent service away from Geni. Yammer won top prize at TechCrunch50, which allowed them to seed more money into the project. It was determined early on that a corporate email address would be required to use Yammer.

In 2009, Yammer went through its first redesign. The main feature set included profiles, profile photos for groups, following suggestions, and a product called 'YammerFox', which was an extension for Firefox that popped up an alert to the end user when a message was received.

In 2010, new integrations were launched in the application, such as polls, chat, events, links, topics, Q&A, and ideas. Yammer also launched their own app store which included Crocodoc and Zendesk. By this time, Yammer had grown to over 1 million total users on the platform.
Yammer also released their SharePoint 2007 Integration, and moved to Scala for their real-time work.

In 2011, Yammer made the move from Scala back to Java for their real-time work due to the complexity of rolling out Scala. Yammer Notifications was released as a replacement to YammerFox. During this period, Yammer grew its userbase to 4 million total users.

In 2012, Yammer purchased OneDrum. This acquisition allowed Yammer to implement real-time document editing, as well as document edit history. Yammer was then purchased by Microsoft for US$1.2 billion. Microsoft announced that the Yammer team would be incorporated into the Microsoft Office division, but would continue to report to Sacks.

Post-acquisition
In 2013, Microsoft integrated Yammer into Dynamics CRM and pushed the Yammer subscription into their Office 365 enterprise plans. In 2014, Microsoft announced that Yammer development was being moved into the Office 365 development team, and Sacks announced that he was leaving Microsoft and Yammer. Yammer also allowed login through Office 365, as well as plans to have Yammer show up in the Office 365 header for selection by end users.

In 2015, Yammer removed several features related to how it worked with SharePoint, including support for SharePoint Server 2013. There was renewed focus on the Yammer Embed Feed.

In 2016, Yammer removed the Yammer Enterprise Plan, due to a shift in using the more general Office 365 subscription structure. They also announced that Yammer would integrate with Office 365 Groups as well as allow end users the ability to create and edit Word, PowerPoint, and Excel documents using Office Online.

In 2019, Microsoft announced "the new Yammer", which featured a redesign based on Microsoft's Fluent Design System. 
In November, they announced full integration into Microsoft Teams, Microsoft's competitor product to Slack.

In February 2023, Microsoft announced that Yammer would be fully integrated into its "employee experience platform" Viva and its own social networking system Viva Engage (which is derived from Yammer), with Yammer to be phased out and replaced by Viva Engage over 2023.

See also
List of social networking services

References

2008 software
2008 establishments in California
Companies based in San Francisco
Companies based in Redmond, Washington
American social networking websites
Blog hosting services
Internet properties established in 2008
Microsoft acquisitions
Microsoft subsidiaries

Microsoft Office
Microsoft websites
Collaborative software
2012 mergers and acquisitions